Kevin Woodward (born 24 October 1942) is a former  Australian rules footballer who played with Hawthorn in the Victorian Football League (VFL).

Notes

External links 

Living people
1942 births
Australian rules footballers from Victoria (Australia)
Hawthorn Football Club players